Silvério Paulo de Albuquerque, O.F.M. (March 11, 1917 – May 28, 2013) was a Brazilian bishop of the Roman Catholic Church.

Paulo de Albuquerque was born in Olinda, Brazil on March 11, 1917, and was ordained a priest on May 30, 1942 with the Roman Catholic order of Orders of Friar Minor. Paulo de Albuquerque was appointed bishop of the Diocese of Caetité on March 17, 1970 and ordained bishop on May 10, 1970. On January 18, 1973 he was appointed bishop of the Archdiocese of Feira de Santana and remained there until his retirement on February 22, 1995. He died on May 28, 2013.

External links
Catholic Hierarchy

1917 births
2013 deaths
People from Olinda
20th-century Roman Catholic bishops in Brazil
Roman Catholic bishops of Feira de Santana
Roman Catholic bishops of Caetité